Mark Wiltse (born May 29, 1988) is a former American soccer player, best known for his days with the Charleston Battery of the USL Professional Division.

Career

College and amateur
Wiltse attended Montgomery High School played four years of college soccer at the University of South Carolina, where he studied management and marketing. He was named to the Conference USA All-Freshman Team after his debut year in 2006, was selected to the All-Conference USA Third Team, the adidas Gamecock Classic All-Tournament Team and the Conference USA All-Tournament Team after his sophomore year in 2007, and was named team co-captain in 2008, before suffering a season-ending leg injury in the first game of his senior season in 2009.

During his college years Wiltse also played for the Central Jersey Spartans in the USL Premier Development League.

Professional
Undrafted out of college, Wiltse signed with Charleston Battery of the USL Pro league on March 29, 2011, and made his professional debut on April 9 in a game against the Charlotte Eagles. On January 10, 2014, Wiltse officially declared his retirement.

References

External links
 South Carolina Gamecocks bio

1988 births
Living people
American soccer players
South Carolina Gamecocks men's soccer players
Central Jersey Spartans players
Charleston Battery players
Montgomery High School (New Jersey) alumni
People from Montgomery Township, New Jersey
Sportspeople from Somerset County, New Jersey
USL League Two players
USL Championship players
Soccer players from New Jersey
Soccer players from Virginia
United States men's youth international soccer players
Association football defenders
Association football midfielders